Pep is an unincorporated community in southern Roosevelt County, in the southeastern part of the U.S. state of New Mexico. The community is composed almost entirely of farms and cattle ranches and is located approximately seven miles south of Dora on New Mexico State Road 206.  The ZIP Code for Pep is 88126.

The origin of the name "Pep" is obscure.

Science fiction author Jack Williamson grew up on a ranch near Pep.

References

Unincorporated communities in Roosevelt County, New Mexico
Unincorporated communities in New Mexico